Persatuan Sepakbola Serang, commonly known as Perserang, is an  Indonesian football club based in Serang Regency, Banten. They play in the Liga 2.

History 
They were founded in 1958. In November 2014, they were promoted to the Liga Indonesia Premier Division for the first time in their history after finishing third in Group 11 of the Second National Round of 2014 Liga Nusantara.

Players

Current squad

Coaching Staff

Stadium 
Perserang plays their home matches in Maulana Yusuf Stadium.

References

External links 
 
 

 
Football clubs in Banten
Football clubs in Indonesia
Association football clubs established in 1958
1958 establishments in Indonesia